Gaede may refer to:

 Bill Gaede (born 1952), Argentine engineer, programmer and Cold War industrial spy
 Enrico Gaede (born 1982), German footballer
 Heinrich Moritz Gaede (1795−1834), German naturalist and entomologist
 Kevin Gaede (born 1959), known as Kevin Gage, American actor
 Max Gaede (1871–1946), German entomologist and engineer
 Wolfgang Gaede (1878–1945), German physicist and pioneer of vacuum engineering
Gaede may also refer to
 14224 Gaede, main-belt asteroid

Surnames from given names